Melanochromis auratus, the auratus cichlid, is a freshwater fish of the cichlid family.  It is also known as golden mbuna and Malawi golden cichlid. It is endemic to the southern region of Lake Malawi, particularly from Jalo Reef southward along the entire western coast down to Crocodile Rocks.

Description
Juveniles and females are bright yellow with black and white stripes on the upper half of the body. Adult male coloration is drastically different with dark brown or black body and light blue or yellow stripes on the upper half of the body.

In the Aquarium
The auratus cichlid is one of the most popular mbuna cichlids in the aquarium trade. In aquarium stores, there will usually be one dominant male that is colored black, the rest will display the submissive "female" coloration of yellow. If this male is sold, the next dominant male will take on the black color.

Reproduction
Like many other cichlids from Lake Malawi, auratus cichlids are mouthbrooders. Females hold their fertilized eggs and fry in their mouth for a few weeks before releasing the fry.

See also
Mbuna
List of freshwater aquarium fish species

References

auratus
Taxa named by George Albert Boulenger
Fish described in 1897
Fish of Lake Malawi